Thermoplastic road marking paint, also called hot melt marking paint, is a kind of powder paint. After cooling, the paint forms a thick polymer layer, which is wear-resistant, bright, and reflective. In recent years, practical applications tests have proved that the marking lines lack surface roughness and can easily cause wheel slip, resulting in a traffic accident in snow and rainy weather. Therefore, some countries once restricted the use of this paint. In order to increase the antiskid performance of the line, thermoplastic paint has added reflective glass beads.
Thermoplastic can be used very effectively for large anti-skid areas on roads and pedestrian walkways by adding glass beads. It can be produced in any colour and is suitable for car parks, factory walkways, and many other areas. It hardens quickly and can be driven over after just a few minutes.

Components
Thermoplastic marking paint consists of synthetic resin, glass beads, pigments, packing materials, additives, etc.

Synthetic resin has thermoplasticity, make the hot melt coating fast-dry and strongly adhesive to the road surface.
Additives in the paint can increase the plasticity of the coating, and make it resistant to subsidence, pollution and color fading.
Pigments: the common colors of road lines are yellow and white. White pigments are mainly titanium dioxide, zinc oxide, and lithophone, while yellow pigment is mainly heat-resistant yellow lead.
Packing materials, as filling added into the paint, ensure mechanical strength, wear resistance, and color of paint coating. The particle size will affect liquidity and precipitation, as well as the surface processing.
Glass microspheres are added in order to improve the identification of lines at night, to improve the brightness and durability of the marking. Glass bead is colorless and transparent ball, has function of light refraction, focusing and directional reflection. Glass bead mixed in the coating or dispensed throughout the coating surface can reflect car light back to the driver's eyes, thus greatly improving the marking visibility.

Matched machines

A road marking machine is a machine specially used to mark different traffic lines on road surface, and some can remark on old lines directly. It can screed, extrude, or spray processed road paint onto the road surface to form durable coating lines. A hot melt kettle is used for continuously heating, melting, and stirring thermoplastic marking paints, preparing molten paints for the thermoplastic machine, especially for long-distance road-line-marking work. The molten paint quality can affect the line quality greatly.

See also
Pedestrian crossing
Road surface marking
Zebra crossing

References

Paints
Road surface markings